MPPS can stand for:
 Massively Parallel Processing
 Member of Provincial Parliament (disambiguation), in Canada and South Africa
 Million Packets Per Second (referring to throughput for switches and/or routers)
 Modality Performed Procedure Step (used in DICOM, Medical imaging)
 Most Penetrating Particle Size (used in HEPA)
 Mandal Parishad Primary Schools State Government Schools of India.